Hu Changqing (simplified Chinese: 胡长清; 24 August 1948 – 8 March 2000) was a Chinese politician. A former vice-governor of Jiangxi, he was executed in 2000 for corruption.

References 

2000 deaths
Chinese politicians executed for corruption
1948 births
People from Hunan
People's Liberation Army personnel
People executed by China by firearm
Chinese Communist Party politicians